Piedmont is a city in Calhoun and Cherokee counties in the U.S. state of Alabama. The population was 4,400 at the 2020 census. It is included in the Anniston-Oxford, Alabama Metropolitan Statistical Area.

The city is approximately one and a half hours west of Atlanta, Georgia via US Hwy 278, one and a half hours northeast of Birmingham, 20 minutes north of Anniston, Alabama via AL-21, and 25 minutes east of Gadsden, Alabama via US Hwy 278. The campus of Jacksonville State University in Jacksonville, Alabama is approximately ten miles south of Piedmont via AL-21.

The city is located in the foothills of the Appalachian Mountains chain and is surrounded by mountains on the city's southern and eastern sides. The area is home to Duggar Mountain, which is Alabama's second highest point, only trailing Mt. Cheaha by a small margin. Piedmont is a tourist destination for outdoor enthusiasts due to its close proximity to many nearby hiking trails, streams and rivers, mountains, the Duggar Mountain Wilderness, the Talladega National Forest and Coleman Lake. Weiss Lake is fourteen miles north of Piedmont via AL-9 and is known as "the Crappie Capital of the World." Piedmont is home to Terrapin Creek, which is a destination for kayaking, canoeing, camping, swimming and fishing. Each year, particularly in the summer, thousands of people visit Piedmont and the surrounding areas due to the recreational opportunities and natural environment of the area. Piedmont is also home to the Chief Ladiga Trail, which is a paved trail for walking, jogging and bicycling. The trail runs through downtown Piedmont and runs all the way to Atlanta to the east, and to Anniston, Alabama to the south and west.

Two state highways, AL-9 and AL-21, run through the city limits of Piedmont, as well as US Highway 278. The city and surrounding area is served by the Centre-Piedmont-Cherokee County Regional Airport, which was constructed in 2010. Many surrounding communities are served by the 36272 ZIP code, including Spring Garden, Rock Run, Vigo, Knighten's Crossroads, Ballplay, Pleasant Valley and Nance's Creek. An abundance of people from the surrounding designated census areas and communities make the short commute to the city of Piedmont regularly for employment, commerce, dining, recreation and general shopping. Portions of the nearby communities of Nances Creek, Spring Garden, Piedmont Springs and Vigo rely on police and fire coverage from the city of Piedmont.

The current mayor is Bill Baker, who was chosen by the city council to lead after elected mayor Rick Freeman resigned due to medical issues.

History

Founding and early growth 
The area now known as Piedmont is a community that began in the early 1840s, located at the crossroads of two early post roads. Major Jacob Forney Dailey of North Carolina came to Alabama in 1848 and bought land in present-day Piedmont. Major Dailey named the area Cross Plains, and an official post office with that name was established on September 22, 1851.

The Standard Coosa-Thatcher Cotton Mill was established in Piedmont in the late 1800s and was the main source of employment in and around the city for nearly a century. After being named "Hollow Stump" and "Cross Plains" local residents settled for the name Piedmont in 1888. The word Piedmont means "Foot of the mountains" which was more appealing to local residents since the city is surrounded by mountainous scenery.

Recent history 
The Standard Coosa-Thatcher Company was a textile corporation founded in Piedmont in 1891. It was publicly traded beginning in 1922. The firm is important because of its endurance for nearly a century and its expansion throughout the southeast United States and into the western United States. Also known in Piedmont as the "Cotton Mill", it began operating in 1892 and closed in 1995. In 2016, demolition of the building began. Over the next two years or so, workers tore down the mill and reclaimed more than 100-year-old lumber and other material for resale.

Geography 
The city is located less than an hour and forty five minutes from large cities such as Atlanta Georgia, Birmingham Alabama, Chattanooga Tennessee and Huntsville Alabama. Piedmont lies on the eastern border of the state of Alabama, near the border of Georgia. Piedmont is located between Gadsden Alabama and Cedartown Georgia via US highway 278 (West/East) and between Centre Alabama and Jacksonville Alabama/Jacksonville State University via Alabama highway 21 and Alabama highway 9 (North/South). The nearest interstates are I-59 via US highway 278 (Gadsden) and I-20 via Alabama highway 21 or Alabama highway 9 (Anniston/Oxford).

Attractions

Chief Ladiga Trail 
Piedmont is home to the Chief Ladiga Trail. The Seaboard/CSX Railroad was converted into a recreational bike and walking trail as a non-motorized way to travel, exercise, and relax while enjoying the outdoors.

Duggar Mountain Wilderness

Dugger Mountain, the second highest peak in Alabama with an elevation of 2,140 feet (650 m), is located just outside the city limits of Piedmont, which is the closest city to the peak and wilderness area.

The wilderness encompasses some of the most rugged and mountainous terrain in Alabama, as well as numerous endangered and threatened plant communities. It is one of the last intact roadless areas in Alabama's National Forests. Most of the mountain's 16,000 acres (6,500 ha) were too steep to profitably timber harvest. The Pinhoti National Recreation Trail winds through the wilderness area.

Duggar Mountain

Standing at 2,140 feet, Duggar Mountain is Alabama's second highest point, only trailing nearby Mt. Cheaha. Duggar Mountain is known for its hiking trails and scenery. Piedmont lies at the foot of Duggar Mountain, making it visible from most points in and around the city.

Terrapin Creek

There are several canoe and kayak rental services near Terrapin Creek, as well as areas to camp and fish. Thousands of people access this area annually to "float the creek" and enjoy the natural environment of the area.

Cheaha Challenge 
Hundreds of cyclists from more than 20 states participate in the Cheaha Challenge every year. The "Toughest Ride in the South" is a recreational bicycle ride that has been moved to Anniston, AL from Piedmont's Civic Center. The ride follows the Appalachian Highlands Scenic Byway then ends at the top of Cheaha Mountain, Alabama's highest point. The Cheaha Challenge was selected as a Top 10 Event in the State of Alabama by the Alabama Bureau of Tourism & Travel.

Night in the Museum Hotel

This historic home has been relocated from its original location in Piedmont to a location downtown, near the Old Railroad Depot and Museum. Constructed in the late 1800s, this home is believed to be one of the first homes constructed in the Piedmont area. This home is utilized as a two bedroom hotel, as well as a museum. Bedrooms are for rent in the historic Roberts House and include a tour of the museum. The new location of the home is ideal since it is near Piedmont's downtown business district that includes dining, coffee shops, a bar and a variety of stores. The Night in the Museum Hotel is just two blocks from the Chief Ladiga Trail. This exhibit is new to the area and the Roberts House was recently renovated by the city. The Piedmont Historical Society, an IRS qualified 501(c)3 non-profit educational organization that operates the Southern Train Depot Museum, began a preservation project by raising funds and support to first relocate the home to its present site (75 Southern Boulevard) with the purchase of old railroad bed land from Norfolk Southern Railroad Company and second to renovate the home to its original Victorian state, as a safe public museum facility to display artifacts of Piedmont’s history and as a unique “Night In the Museum” Hotel for bikers and hikers of the Chief Ladiga Trail and visitors traveling through the Appalachian Mountains.

Piedmont Aquatic Center

The Piedmont Aquatic Center is owned and operated by the City of Piedmont. The Aquatic Center offers season passes and day passes and is open through the late spring and summer months. The Aquatic Center features water slides, a large outdoor swimming pool and splash pads. The Aquatic Center is located next to the Piedmont Sports Complex. The annual polar plunge is held at the Aquatic Center and all proceeds go to charity. The polar plunge features residents from the local community and surrounding communities who jump into the cold water in January for purposes of giving to charity.

Chief Ladiga Marching Festival

This annual event is held in October of each year and features marching bands from all over the state of Alabama competing for a trophy at the end of the ceremony. The event has grown to include marching bands from neighboring Georgia. The Chief Ladiga Marching Festival is held on the campus of Piedmont High School.

Southern Railroad Depot Museum

The Piedmont Historical Society's Southern Railroad Depot Museum, is an 1867 historic facility registered on the National and Alabama preservation registry. The history of Piedmont, Alabama, a community in northeast Calhoun County, is told by art, cultural and historic displays, exhibits, artifacts and iMovies. A Southern Railroad caboose is displayed adjacent to the original loading dock and cargo cart.

Foothills Motocross and Park

Located at 132 Greenwood Rd, Foothills Motocross and Park opened to the public in early September 2020. The property contains a dirt track with man made hills to perform stunts. Food and beverages are sometimes offered and the events is typically held on weekends. The venue is gaining popularity with local residents, as well as motocross enthusiasts from other areas.

Indian Mountain ATV Park

Located just outside Piedmont in neighboring Cherokee County at 11620 County Rd 8 Piedmont, AL 36272, Indian Mountain ATV Park is a destination for ATV and OHV courses, camping, hiking and other outdoor activities. The park contains dirt trails for ATVs and ATV racing competitions and sits on 4,700 acres of land. The park began to see a major increase in visitors in 2020, not long after being open to the public. The park is located on the Indian Mountain Tract.

Media 

AM radio
 WPID 1280 AM

FM radio
 WJCK 88.3 FM (Christian)
  WCKA Alabama 810 AM 94.3 and 97.1 FM broadcasts Piedmont High School football games.

Demographics

2020 census

As of the 2020 United States census, there were 4,787 people, 2,040 households, and 1,308 families residing in the city.

2010 census
As of the census of 2010, there were 4,878 people, 2,053 households, and 1,351 families residing in the city. The racial makeup of the city was 87.0% White, 10.0% Black or African American, 0.5% Native American, 0.1% Asian, 0.0% Pacific Islander, 0.5% from other races, and 1.9% from two or more races. Hispanic or Latino people of any race were 1.3% of the population.

In the city, the population was spread out, with 24.0% under the age of 18, 8.2% from 18 to 24, 23.5% from 25 to 44, 27.8% from 45 to 64, and 16.6% who were 65 years of age or older. The median age was 40.5 years. For every 100 females, there were 88.3 males. For every 100 females age 18 and over, there were 86.5 males.

The median income for a household in the city was $31,589, and the median income for a family was $39,417. Males had a median income of $36,332 versus $28,355 for females. The per capita income for the city was $17,573. About 21.1% of families and 24.4% of the population were below the poverty line, including 39.0% of those under age 18 and 9.8% of those age 65 or over.

Education

Schools 
The Piedmont City School District consists of three schools: Piedmont Elementary School, Piedmont Middle School, and Piedmont High School.

The Piedmont City Schools athletic teams are known as the Bulldogs. Piedmont High School is a member of the Alabama High School Athletic Association and participates in Class 3A Football, Basketball, Baseball, Wrestling (1A-4A), Golf (Boys 3A, Girls 1A-5A), Volleyball, and Track. They also have a band: the Piedmont Blue Knights Marching Band, class 1A.

Notable people
Willie Dee Bowles, educator and historian
Rick Bragg, writer, 1996 Pulitzer Prize winner
Desmond Doss, first conscientious objector to receive the Medal of Honor
William E. Harbour, civil rights activist
Kenneth A. Roberts, U.S. Representative, 1951–1965

References

External links 

 

Cities in Alabama
Populated places established in 1888
Cities in Calhoun County, Alabama
Cities in Cherokee County, Alabama
1888 establishments in Alabama